Musineon is a genus of flowering plants in the carrot family Apiaceae, known generally as wild parsleys, though plants of other related genera share that name.

Species:
Musineon divaricatum (Pursh) Nutt. - leafy wild parsley
Musineon glaucescens Lesica
Musineon lineare (Rydb.) Mathias - narrowleaf wild parsley
Musineon naomiensis L.M.Schultz & F.J.Sm.
Musineon tenuifolium Nutt. - slender wild parsley
Musineon vaginatum Rydb. - sheathed wild parsley

References

External links 
 USDA Plants Profile
 

Apioideae
Taxa named by Constantine Samuel Rafinesque
Apioideae genera